The New Encyclopedia of Snakes is an encyclopedia by Chris Mattison.

Book summary
The encyclopedia has information about snakes that is listed from A-Z. The book has pictures and information about snake morphology, habitats, diets, hunting and defense behaviors, taxonomy, and a history of human responses to snakes.

Reception
It was reviewed by Science Activities, Washington Times, Booklist, King Features Syndicate, Wildlife Activist, Dover Post, Choice, and Science Books and Fun.

References

1995 non-fiction books
Encyclopedias of science
Snakes